Wik Ompom (Ambama) is an extinct Paman language of the Cape York Peninsula of Queensland, Australia. Its name suggests it is one of the Wik languages, but typologically it is distinct.

References 

Wik languages
Extinct languages of Queensland